Choosing Children may refer to:

The process of adoption
Choosing Children, a 1985 documentary on lesbian parenthood produced by Debra Chasnoff
Choosing Children: Genes, Disability, and Design, a 2006 book by Jonathan Glover
Modern Dilemma : Choosing Children, a book on genetic engineering ethics by Sheila McLean